Bad Boy Latino is a Latin hip hop record label founded in 2005 by recording artists P. Diddy and Pitbull.

History
In 2004, Sean Combs made the decision to expand his fledgling Bad Boy Records imprint to new territories. His first expansion was southern imprint, Bad Boy South, and his second was to be a Latino label, in 2005 the birth of Bad Boy Latino came about as Emilio Estefan came on board. The expansion was granted to Bad Boy through its new deal with Atlantic Records.

The label then signed artists, eventually signing Pitbull, Christian Daniel, LJ, and Heath Woods and Principe El Notorio from Harlem. 
Bad Boy Latino's first release would come from Pitbull in the form of his remix album, Money Is Still A Major Issue. The album would not sell many copies upon its 2005 release date. This album was released by Bad Boy Latino, but was distributed by TVT Records, because Pitbull was still a signed artist on their roster and had to honor his contract.

In 2006, the label released Christian Daniel's self-titled debut along with Pitbull's third album, El Mariel.

In 2007, the label released Pitbull's fourth album, The Boatlift.

Artists
 Pitbull
 Emilio Estefan 
Emilio Estefan is not on the roster as an artist but serves as the driving force along with Mr. Combs in the overall direction in which Bad Boy Latino should go.
 Christian Daniel
 LJ
 Heath Woods

Discography

References 

Hip hop record labels
Record labels established in 2005
American record labels
Latin American music record labels